The United Nations Disarmament Commission (UNDC) is a United Nations commission under the United Nations General Assembly which primarily deals with issues relating to Disarmament.

History
The United Nations Disarmament Commission was first established on 11 January 1952 by United Nations General Assembly Resolution 502 (VI). This  commission was put under the jurisdiction of the United Nations Security Council and its mandate included: preparing proposals for a treaty for the regulation, limitation and balanced reduction of all armed forces and all armaments, including the elimination of all weapons of mass destruction.
 
However, this commission only met a few times, and was followed by a succession of other disarmament-focused bodies: the Ten-Nation Disarmament Committee (1960), the Eighteen Nation Committee on Disarmament (1962), the Conference of the Committee on Disarmament (1969) and, finally, the Conference on Disarmament (1979), which still meets to this day.

The second iteration of the commission was formed on 30 June 1978 by the General Assembly as a subsidiary organ of the Assembly. This commissions includes all members states of the United Nations and meets yearly in New York for approximately three weeks. It is a deliberative body, whose mandate is considering and making recommendations on various issues in the field of disarmament. Due to the fact that disarmament is a substantial topic, the UNDC has traditionally focused on a limited number of agenda items at each session, typically three or four. In 1998, this tendency was made official by the General assembly, who through decision 52/492, limited the work of the UNDC to "two agenda items per year from the whole range of disarmament issues, including one on nuclear disarmament." Additionally, each topic is considered in the UNDC for a three-year period. Each session, working groups are created, the number of which is dependent on the number of agenda items being discussed by the body.

See also
Disarmament
United Nations Office for Disarmament Affairs
United Nations General Assembly

References

External links
UNGA Res. 502 (VI)
UNGA A/RES/S-10/2
A/INF/52/4/Add.1

United Nations organizations based in North America
Arms control